Hazret Medzhidovich Sovmen (born 1 May 1937) was the second president of the Republic of Adygea, Russia, having succeeded Aslan Dzharimov at the post.  Sovmen is a university professor from Maykop. Before becoming President, Hazret Sovmen had been a successful businessman (with links to Russian entrepreneurs in Siberia), having started off as a bulldozer driver in a gold mine in Chukotka. He is the founder of Polyus Gold, Russia's leading gold-mining company.

Early life

Sovmen was born in the aul of Afipsip in Takhtamukaysky District of Adyghe Autonomous Oblast in the Russian SFSR, Soviet Union. He did his military service in the Black Sea Fleet and graduated from the Saint Petersburg Mining Institute. He started working at a gold mine in Chukotka in 1961 and also worked on mines in the Krasnoyarsk Krai and Magadan Oblast. He became manager of the Polyus Mine in 1981. During his time as president, he was the only regional head without any spouse.

Political career

Sovmen was elected to the office of President on 13 January 2002 by direct suffrage.  He was faced with the challenges of leading one of a Russia's poorest republics, officially declared bankrupt by the Government of Russia. Sovmen was involved in political activities with the Slavic people Union, Adygeya's principal opposition party.  Russian president Vladimir Putin is believed to have supported Sovmen. In 1997, Russian President Yeltsin awarded him with the Order of Merit for the Fatherland 3rd class. On 13 January 2007 he was succeeded as Adygean President by Aslan Tkhakushinov.

He is a member of the United Russia party.

References

1937 births
Circassian people of Russia
Living people
Heads of the Republic of Adygea
People from Takhtamukaysky District
Saint Petersburg Mining University alumni
Soviet miners